Nan Ping (1918–1989) was a People's Republic of China politician and People's Liberation Army major general. He was born in Changshan County, Zibo, Shandong Province. He was Chinese Communist Party Committee Secretary of Zhejiang Province (1973) as well as governor of Zhejiang.

Bibliography
汪东兴. 《汪东兴回忆: 毛泽东与林彪反革命集团的斗争》. 当代中国出版社. 1997年: 145–150页. .

1918 births
1989 deaths
People's Republic of China politicians from Shandong
Chinese Communist Party politicians from Shandong
People's Liberation Army generals from Shandong
Governors of Zhejiang
Political office-holders in Zhejiang